Mike Busse (born 9 February 1993) is a Dutch professional footballer who plays as a right back for SCH '44.

Club career
He formerly played for Almere City and joined Cambuur in summer 2015.

References

External links
 Voetbal International profile 

1993 births
Living people
People from Woerden
Association football fullbacks
Dutch footballers
Almere City FC players
SC Cambuur players
SV TEC players
Eerste Divisie players
Tweede Divisie players
Footballers from Utrecht (province)